The 2019 Nigerian gubernatorial elections were held for state governors in 31 out of 36 Nigerian states. All but three were held on 2 March 2019 with the election for Rivers State being postponed until 4 April, while the Kogi State and Bayelsa State elections were both held on 16 November. The last regular gubernatorial elections for all states were in 2015.

All states have a two term limit for Governors which made several incumbent governors ineligible for re-election. Seven APC governors were term-limited while eleven incumbent APC governors were eligible for re-election. Among PDP governors, three were term-limited while ten could seek re-election. Elections were held in 18 of the 22 states with APC governors and all 13 of the states with PDP governors. Incumbent state governors running to be reelected included 11 APC governors and 10 PDP governors.

The PDP picked up four governorships from the APC in Adamawa, Bauchi, Oyo, and Zamfara while the APC picked up two governorships from the PDP in Gombe and Kwara; net change was PDP+2. Court decisions changed results in several states with the APC winners in Bayelsa and Zamfara being disqualified prior to their inaugurations while the PDP's win in Imo State was overturned after the erstwhile winner governed for over seven months.

Results summary

Notes

Abia State 

One-term PDP incumbent Okezie Ikpeazu sought re-election and won the PDP nomination while businessman Uchechukwu Sampson Ogah became his main opponent by winning the APC nomination. Ikpeazu won re-election, 60–23.

Adamawa State 

One-term APC incumbent Bindo Jibrilla sought re-election and won the APC nomination while former Acting Governor Ahmadu Umaru Fintiri became his main opponent by winning the PDP nomination. Fintiri defeated incumbent Jibrilla, 43–37.

Akwa Ibom State 

One-term PDP incumbent Udom Gabriel Emmanuel sought re-election and won the PDP nomination while former managing director of the Niger Delta Development Commission Nsima Ekere became his main opponent by winning the APC nomination. Emmanuel won re-election, 75–25.

Bauchi State 

One-term APC incumbent Mohammed Abdullahi Abubakar sought re-election and won the APC nomination while former FCT Minister Bala Mohammed became his main opponent by winning the PDP nomination. Mohammed defeated incumbent Abubakar, 46–45.

Bayelsa State 

Two-term PDP incumbent Henry Seriake Dickson was ineligible for re-election due to term limits. Businessman David Lyon won the APC nomination while Bayelsa Central Senator Douye Diri won the PDP nomination. Initial results showed Lyon defeating Diri, 71–29, but due to a false certificate from APC Deputy Governor nominee Biobarakuma Degi, Lyon was disqualified and Diri was declared winner.

Benue State 

One-term incumbent Samuel Ortom switched from the APC to the PDP in 2019 and sought re-election under the PDP banner; Ortom won the PDP nomination while former Representative Emmanuel Jime became his main opponent by winning the APC nomination. Ortom won re-election, 52–42.

Borno State 

Two-term APC incumbent Kashim Shettima was ineligible for re-election due to term limits. Former Commissioner of Reconstruction, Rehabilitation and Resettlement Babagana Umara Zulum won the APC nomination while former Borno ANPP Chairman Mohammad Imam won the PDP nomination. Zulum defeated Imam, 93–5.

Cross River State 

One-term PDP incumbent Ben Ayade sought re-election and won the PDP nomination while Cross River Central Senator John Owan Enoh became his main opponent by winning the APC nomination. Ayade won re-election, 73–25.

Delta State 

One-term PDP incumbent Ifeanyi Okowa sought re-election and won the PDP nomination while businessman Great Ogboru became his main opponent by winning the APC nomination. Okowa won re-election, 80–19.

Ebonyi State 

One-term PDP incumbent Dave Umahi sought re-election and won the PDP nomination while Ebonyi South Senator Sonni Ogbuoji became his main opponent by winning the APC nomination. Umahi won re-election, 82–17.

Enugu State 

One-term PDP incumbent Ifeanyi Ugwuanyi sought re-election and won the PDP nomination while former Enugu North Senator Ayogu Eze became his main opponent by winning the APC nomination. Okowa won re-election, 96–2.

Gombe State 

Two-term PDP incumbent Ibrahim Hassan Dankwambo was ineligible for re-election due to term limits. 2015 APC gubernatorial nominee Muhammad Inuwa Yahaya won the APC nomination while Gombe North Senator Usman Bayero Nafada won the PDP nomination. Yahaya defeated Nafada, 60–37.

Imo State 

Two-term APC incumbent Rochas Okorocha was ineligible for re-election due to term limits. Imo West Senator Hope Uzodinma won the APC nomination, former Deputy House Speaker Emeka Ihedioha won the PDP nomination, former Imo North Senator Ifeanyi Ararume won the APGA nomination, and Okorocha's Chief of Staff Uche Nwosu became the AA nominee after losing the APC primary. Initial results showed Ihedioha winning with 38% while Nwosu, Ararume, and Uzodinma received 27%, 16%, and 14%, respectively. Ihedioha received the certificate of return and governed until 14 January 2020 when the Supreme Court declared Uzodinma the winner and he took office as Governor.

Jigawa State 

One-term incumbent Mohammed Badaru Abubakar sought re-election and won the APC nomination while former Chief of Staff to Governor Sule Lamido Aminu Ibrahim Ringim became his main opponent by winning the PDP nomination. Abubakar won re-election, 74–26.

Kaduna State 

One-term APC incumbent Nasir Ahmad el-Rufai sought re-election and won the APC nomination while former Representative Isah Ashiru became his main opponent by winning the PDP nomination. Abubakar won re-election, 55–43.

Kano State 

One-term APC incumbent Abdullahi Umar Ganduje sought re-election and won the APC nomination while former Commissioner of Works, Housing and Transport Abba Kabir Yusuf became his main opponent by winning the PDP nomination. The election was declared inconclusive with Kabir Yusuf in the lead but the supplementary elections in certain areas pushed Ganduje to win re-election, 50.2-49.8.

Katsina State 

One-term APC incumbent Aminu Bello Masari sought re-election and won the APC nomination while Katsina South Senator Garba Yakubu Lado became his main opponent by winning the PDP nomination. Masari won re-election, 70–29.

Kebbi State 

One-term APC incumbent Abubakar Atiku Bagudu sought re-election and won the APC nomination while Kebbi North Senator Isa Mohammed Galaudu became his main opponent by winning the PDP nomination. Bagudu won re-election, 85–13.

Kogi State 

One-term APC incumbent Yahaya Bello sought election and won the APC nomination while engineer Musa Wada became his main opponent by winning the PDP nomination. Bello won, 67–31.

Kwara State 

Two-term PDP incumbent Abdulfatah Ahmed was ineligible for re-election due to term limits. 2015 PDP Kwara Central Senate nominee AbdulRahman AbdulRazaq won the APC nomination while Representative Razak Atunwa won the PDP nomination. AbdulRazaq defeated Atunwa, 73–25.

Lagos State 

One-term APC incumbent Akinwunmi Ambode sought re-election but lost the APC nomination to former Commissioner Babajide Sanwo-Olu. 2015 PDP gubernatorial nominee Jimi Agbaje became his main opponent by winning the PDP nomination. Sanwo-Olu defeated Agbaje, 76–21.

Nasarawa State 

Two-term APC incumbent Umaru Tanko Al-Makura was ineligible for re-election due to term limits. Businessman Abdullahi Sule won the APC nomination while Representative David Ombugadu won the PDP nomination and former Federal Minister of Information Labaran Maku won the APGA nomination. Sule defeated Ombugadu and Maku, 49-27-20.

Niger State 

One-term APC incumbent Abubakar Sani Bello sought re-election and won the APC nomination while 2015 PDP gubernatorial nominee Umar Nasko became his main opponent by winning the PDP nomination. Bello won re-election, 58–33.

Ogun State 

Two-term APC incumbent Ibikunle Amosun was ineligible for re-election due to term limits. Businessman Dapo Abiodun won the APC nomination, banker 	Gboyega Nasir Isiaka won the ADC nomination, Ogun East Senator Buruji Kashamu won the PDP nomination, and Representative Adekunle Akinlade became the APM nominee after losing the APC primary. Abiodun won with 35% while Akinlade, Isiaka, and Kashamu received 33%, 16%, and 10%, respectively.

Oyo State 

Two-term APC incumbent Abiola Ajimobi was ineligible for re-election due to term limits. Former CBN Deputy Governor for Operations Adebayo Adelabu won the APC nomination while 2015 SDP gubernatorial nominee Seyi Makinde won the PDP nomination. Makinde defeated Adelabu, 56–39.

Plateau State 

One-term APC incumbent Simon Lalong sought re-election and won the APC nomination while Plateau South Senator Jeremiah Useni became his main opponent by winning the PDP nomination. Lalong won re-election, 51–47.

Rivers State 

One-term PDP incumbent Ezenwo Nyesom Wike sought re-election and won the PDP nomination while Biokpomabo Awara became his main opponent by winning the AAC nomination as the APC were barred from running candidates. The election was suspended after violence and on April 3, INEC declared that Wike had won as the total number of voters in areas where elections were cancelled or did not hold was not enough for Awara to win. The results were Wike 83-Awara 17.

Sokoto State 

One-term incumbent Aminu Tambuwal switched from the APC to the PDP in 2019 and sought re-election under the PDP banner; Tambuwal won the PDP nomination while former Deputy Governor Ahmad Aliyu became his main opponent by winning the APC nomination. Tambuwal won re-election, 49.41-49.37.

Taraba State 

One-term PDP incumbent Darius Ishaku sought re-election and won the PDP nomination while former Deputy Governor Sani Abubakar Danladi became his main opponent by winning the APC nomination. Ishaku won re-election, 57–40.

Yobe State 

Two-term APC incumbent Ibrahim Gaidam was ineligible for re-election due to term limits. Former APC National Secretary Mai Mala Buni won the APC nomination while Ambassador Umar Iliya Damagum won the PDP nomination. Buni defeated Damagum, 81–18.

Zamfara State 

Two-term APC incumbent Abdul'aziz Abubakar Yari was ineligible for re-election due to term limits. Commissioner Mukhtar Shehu Idris won the APC nomination while former Representative Bello Matawalle won the PDP nomination. Initial results showed Idris defeating Matawalle, 67–24, but due to improper holding of primaries, all APC (and thus Idris) votes were voided and Matawalle was declared winner.

References 

Gubernatorial
 
February 2019 events in Nigeria
2019